The president of the Departmental Council of Corrèze (French: Président du conseil départemental de la Corrèze), until 2015 the president of the General Council of Corrèze (Président du conseil général de la Corrèze), prepares and supervises the spending of the budget and the decisions voted by the departmental councillors. The officeholder, who is in charge of financial management and heads the department's administration, has been Midi Corrézien's Pascal Coste of The Republicans since 2015.

Tasks and duties
The president has numerous functions: convening and chairing meetings, preparing and carrying out deliberations, signing conventions and acting as legal representative of the institution. If necessary, the president can delegate some of his functions to his vice presidents. The President of the Corrèze Departmental Council is assisted by seven vice presidents entrusted with different missions. Together they form the Bureau, which decides the main outlines of department policy and ensures their implementation.

List of officeholders

See also 
 Departmental Council of Corrèze
 List of presidents of departmental councils (France)

External links 
 (fr) Corrèze Departmental Council Official website

Corrèze